Ahmed Garba (born 24 May 1980), commonly known as Yaro Yaro, is a Nigerian football manager and former player, who played as a striker.

Career
Garba was a member of the Nigeria national team at the 1998 Carlsberg Cup.

In 1997, he was reportedly offered a four-year contract by a Borussia Dortmund II. However, the Nigerian Football Association did not allow the transfer from Kano Pillars to go through.

In 2012, Garba joined Nigerian Premier League club Wikki Tourists F.C.

In July 2015, he was made interim manager of Kano Pillars.

Honours
Nigeria
 Carlsberg Cup: 1998

External links

References

Living people
1980 births
Nigerian footballers
Association football forwards
Danish Superliga players
Enyimba F.C. players
Akademisk Boldklub players
Kano Pillars F.C. players
Nigerian expatriate footballers
Expatriate men's footballers in Denmark
Expatriate footballers in Germany
Nigeria international footballers
Sportspeople from Kano